Collamore is a surname. Notable people with the surname include:

Allan Collamore (1887–1980), American professional baseball pitcher 
Brian Collamore (born 1950), American politician

See also
Collymore